

The crash of Canadian Pacific Air Lines Flight 3505 occurred on 21 July 1951 when a Douglas DC-4 four-engined piston airliner registered CF-CPC of Canadian Pacific Air Lines disappeared on a scheduled flight for the United Nations from Vancouver, Canada, to Tokyo, Japan. Neither the aircraft nor the 31 passengers and six crew have been found. The incident marked the first aircraft loss during the Korean Airlift.

Accident
At 18:35 the DC-4 departed Vancouver International Airport, Canada on a scheduled flight to Tokyo; it was due to stop over at Anchorage Airport in Alaska. The flight was on schedule and reported at the Cape Spencer intersection in British Columbia 90 minutes out from Anchorage; it gave an estimate of 24:00 for Yakutat in Alaska. Nothing further was heard from the aircraft, and at 00:44 an emergency warning was issued when the aircraft was overdue to report. The United States Air Force and Royal Canadian Air Force carried out an extensive search but failed to find any trace of the aircraft or its 37 occupants. The search was finally called off on 31 October 1951.

Aircraft
The aircraft, a Douglas DC-4 four-engined piston airliner had been built in 1944 for the United States Army Air Forces as a Douglas C-54A Skymaster but on delivery in June 1944 it was diverted to the United States Navy with the designation R5D-1. In 1946, it was converted to a civil Douglas DC-4 standard for Pan American Airlines as Clipper Winged Racer. It was sold to Canadian Pacific Airlines in 1950.

Passengers and crew
All six crew members were Canadian.  The 31 passengers included two sailors of the Royal Canadian Navy, 26 members of the United States military and 3 civilian US citizens.

Probable cause
In 1974, the Civil Aviation Authority (United Kingdom) reported: "As no traces of the aircraft or its occupants has been found to date the cause of the disappearance has not been determined."

Similar accidents
1979 Varig Boeing 707 disappearance
 1948 Airborne Transport DC-3 (DST) disappearance
 1953 Skyways Avro York disappearance
 BSAA Star Ariel disappearance
 BSAA Star Tiger disappearance
 Flying Tiger Line Flight 739
 Hawaii Clipper
 Malaysia Airlines Flight 370

References
Citations

Bibliography

Accidents and incidents involving the Douglas DC-4
Airliner accidents and incidents with an unknown cause
Aviation accidents and incidents in 1951
1951 Canadian Pacific Air Lines Douglas DC-4 disappearance
Missing aircraft
1951 in Alaska
July 1951 events in the United States